Liebenau is a town in the district of Kassel, in Hesse, Germany. It is situated on the river Diemel, 25 km northwest of Kassel.

References

Kassel (district)